Saidabad (also Romanized as Saʿīdābād; also known as Saeedābād) is a village in Aliabad Rural District, in the Central District of Anbarabad County, Kerman Province, Iran. At the 2006 census, its population was 217, in 48 families.

References 

Populated places in Anbarabad County